Sarhud Khoda Rahim (also Romanized as Sarhūd Khodā Raḥim) is a village in Shahi Rural District, Sardasht District, Dezful County, Khuzestan Province, Iran. At the 2006 census, its population was 23, in 5 families.

References 

Populated places in Dezful County